The St. Michael's Catholic Church Complex is a church in Spalding, Nebraska.  The Gothic Revival main church was designed by J.H. Craddock.  The convent building, built during 1926–27, was designed by Omaha architect Jacob M. Nachtigal.

The complex was added to the National Register in 1983.

References

Churches in the Roman Catholic Diocese of Grand Island
Churches on the National Register of Historic Places in Nebraska
Gothic Revival church buildings in Nebraska
Renaissance Revival architecture in Nebraska
Roman Catholic churches completed in 1909
Churches in Greeley County, Nebraska
National Register of Historic Places in Greeley County, Nebraska
1909 establishments in Nebraska
20th-century Roman Catholic church buildings in the United States